Peter Barrett (1831 – 22 July 1907) was an Australian politician.

Barrett was born in Yorkshire in 1844. In 1886 he was elected to the Tasmanian House of Assembly, representing the seat of North Launceston. He served until 1897, when he was defeated contesting Launceston. He died in 1907 in Launceston.

References

1831 births
1907 deaths
Members of the Tasmanian House of Assembly